The Red Army invasion of Armenia, also known as the Sovietization or the Soviet invasion of Armenia, the Soviet occupation of Armenia, or Soviet intervention in Armenia was a military campaign which was carried out by the 11th Army of Soviet Russia from September to 29 November 1920 in order to install a new Soviet government in the First Republic of Armenia, a former territory of the Russian Empire. The invasion coincided with two concurrent events, the Turkish invasion, as well as the anti-government insurrection which was staged by the local Armenian Bolsheviks in the capital, Yerevan, and other cities and populated places within the country. The invasion led to the dissolution of the First Republic of Armenia and the establishment of the Armenian Soviet Socialist Republic.

Background 
The governing party of Armenia was “Dashnaktsutyun” with socialist-nationalist views. The government of Armenia was west-oriented, which was mainly reasoned by the fact that U.S. President V. Wilson had drafted a favorable map for Armenia according to the Treaty of Sevres. While the Armenian government believed in the realization of what is now known as Wilsonian Armenia, Bolsheviks and Kemalists claimed the fragility of the newly-established state.

From 19 July to 7 August 1920 II Congress of Communist International was held, the manifest of which stipulated the following. “In the conflict of Entente with Turkey Armenia played the same programmatic role as Belgium in the conflict with Germany, as Serbia in the conflict with Austria-Hungary. After Republic of Armenia was established – without borders and without potential to live- Wilson refused the Armenian mandate which had been offered him by League of Nations, since the soil of Armenia veils neither oil nor platinum. “Liberated” Armenia is now less protected than it has haver been.”  

Inspired by the Bolsheviks’ success in Azerbaijan, Armenian Bolsheviks organized a military coup/uprising May 1920, which resulted in resignation of the government of Vratsian, however new government of Ohanjanyan managed to suppress the coup with his tough policy.

From one side Kemalist Turkey had the intention to attack Armenia, and from the other side Bolsheviks intended to Sovietize it, therefore it was evident that both would succeed if their actions were synchronized. Soviet Russia was not averse to using the aggression of the Turks in the issue of sovietization of Armenia, and therefore for this purpose it was necessary to prepare the aggression of the Turks with the appropriate propaganda .

Such political situation inspired Bolsheviks, and particularly Trotsky, who was a supporter of the idea of permanent revolution. Trotsky wanted to export revolution to the East, initially to Persia, and for that purpose Congress of the Peoples of the East was called in 1-8 September 1920 in Baku. The Congress formulated a Council of propaganda and actions of Peoples of the East, which on 17 September adopted a resolution on enforced Sovietization of Armenia with the help of Turkish aggression.

After military defeat of Dashnak forces by Turks in October-November 1920, the Red army invaded Armenia, where Armenian SSR was established in November 1920. The Red Army continued to face military opposition only in Syunik, where Garegin Njdeh and his soldiers fought until July 1921.

Treaty 

On December 2, 1920, an agreement was signed on behalf of the Dashnak government of Armenia.

Its terms were as follows:

 Armenia was declared a Soviet Socialist Republic.
 A Provisional Military-Revolutionary Committee shall assume power over Armenia until the convention of a Congress of Soviets 
 Soviet Russia recognized the entire Yerevan province, Zangezur, part of Kars province, some regions of Kazakh province and the territories of Tiflis province as an integral part of the Republic of Armenia, which were part of the Republic of Armenia until September 28, 1920.
 The officers of the Army of the Republic of Armenia were released from responsibility for actions initiated prior to the proclamation of Soviet power in Armenia
 The current figures of the current Armenian political party (Dashnaktzutiun) and other social parties of the Republic of Armenia were not to be subject to repression for membership in these parties.
 The composition of the temporary ruling committee was to consist of 5 Bolsheviks and two left confederates.
 The government of Soviet Russia was committed to ensuring the security of the territory of Soviet Armenia

Soviet rationale 
According to historian Brinegar, Sovietization of Armenia was pushed by a faction of Bolsheviks including Narimanov, Iosif Stalin, and Grigori (Sergo) Ordzhonikidze who considered the occupation of Armenia and Georgia necessary for stability and the elimination of anti-Bolshevik activity in border regions. Additionally, Lenin feared the Entente was planning to use Georgia as a staging ground for retaking Baku, which provided oil to the Soviets.

A 1967 USSR book describes the event as follows:"On November 29, 1920, an armed uprising of the working people of Armenia, headed by the Communist Party and aided by the Russian people, put an end to the ill-famed Dashnak rule. The years of Dashnak rule (1918-20) are another grim page in the history of the Armenian people. Ceaseless warfare and massacres, anarchy and tyranny, hunger and poverty, pillage and violence, blood and tears—those are the essential features of that period. The country was on the verge of ruin. The economy of Armenia had been greatly deranged. Gross industrial output had decreased in 1919 more than twelve fold as against 1913. Farming and animal husbandry were on the verge of disaster. Gross agricultural output for 1919 had dropped almost sixfold as compared with 1913 and crop areas had decreased more than fourfold. Under the Dashnak rule the peasants had over 14 kinds of taxes to pay. Hunger and poverty gave rise to frequent epidemics. Armenia became a Soviet state, ruled by the working people—the workers and the peasants."

See also 
 Turkish–Armenian War
 May uprisings

References

Further reading 

 Khatisian, Alexander. Հայաստանի Հանրապետութեան Ծագումն ու Զարգացումը (The Birth and Development of the Armenian Republic). Athens: Nor Or Publishing, 1930.
 Ter Minassian, Anahide. La République d’Arménie: 1918-1920. Bruxelles: Editions Complexe, 1989.

Conflicts in 1920
Wars involving Armenia
Wars involving Azerbaijan
Wars involving Russia
Wars involving the Soviet Union
Wars involving Turkey
Russian Civil War
Armenian Soviet Socialist Republic
1920 in Armenia
Armenia–Russia relations
First Republic of Armenia
Invasions by the Soviet Union
Invasions of Armenia
June 1920 events
July 1920 events
August 1920 events
November 1920 events